Kangping is a town in Jiangcheng Hani and Yi Autonomous County, Yunnan, China.

Administrative division
As of 2016, the town is divided into nine villages: 
 Yingpanshan
 Dashujiao
 Manlaojie
 Mankelao
 Zhongping
 Mengkang
 Yaojiashan
 Jiebei
 Liangkeshu

History
On December 28, 2012, it was upgraded to a town.

Geography
The town sits at the western Jiangcheng Hani and Yi Autonomous County. It is surrounded by Ning'er Hani and Yi Autonomous County on the northwest, Simao District on the west, Jinghong on the south, and Laos on the southeast.

The Manlao River flows through the town northwest to southeast.

Economy
The town's economy is based on nearby mineral resources and agricultural resources. Tea, sugarcane, coffee, cassava, fruit, lac, banana, pineapple, and bamboo are cash crops of the town. The region abounds with copper, lead, tungsten, zinc, salt, coal, gypsum, limestone, terrazzo, and sand.

Demographics

As of 2017, the National Bureau of Statistics of China estimates the town's population now to be 24,403.

Transportation
The Provincial Highway S214 passes across the town northwest to southeast.

References

Bibliography

Divisions of Jiangcheng Hani and Yi Autonomous County